The Babe is a 1992 American biographical sports drama film about the life of famed baseball player Babe Ruth, who is portrayed by John Goodman. Directed by Arthur Hiller, written by John Fusco, it was released in the United States on April 17, 1992, to mixed reviews. The somewhat fictionalized account of Ruth's life begins in Maryland with his childhood. The film covers his personal life and rise as a ball player with the Red Sox, trade to New York, and decline in health and career that ends with his walking away after being a "name only" manager to boost ticket sales.

Plot
The story begins in Baltimore, Maryland in 1902 where seven-year-old George Herman Ruth Jr. is sent to the St. Mary's Industrial School for Boys, a reformatory and orphanage. Ruth is sent by his father, George Herman Ruth Sr., who cannot handle raising the boy on his own.  At the school, Ruth is schooled by Catholic missionaries and ridiculed by the other children for his large size.  Brother Matthias Boutlier, the Head of Discipline at St. Mary's, first introduces Ruth to the game of baseball.  During a session of batting practice, Ruth hits several towering home runs. Matthias and others are stunned by Ruth's amazing power to drive the ball.

The film then flashes forward to 1914, where a 19-year-old Ruth excels on St. Mary's baseball team, both as a powerful hitter and a great pitcher.  Ruth's amazing skills come to the attention of manager Jack Dunn. Since Ruth is underage, Dunn decides to adopt Ruth and sign him to a contract with the Baltimore Orioles.  In the middle of the 1914 baseball season, Ruth is sold to the Boston Red Sox.  Ruth begins to gain wide attention for his home runs and becomes popular in Boston. However, he angers Red Sox owner Harry Frazee during a party, and following the 1919 season, Ruth demands a raise and a suite for road games. Instead of meeting his demands, Frazee sells him to the New York Yankees to finance his Broadway shows, which have lost money.

Ruth becomes very popular in New York, helping the Yankees win the 1923 World Series. Later he hits two home runs for Johnny Sylvester, a sick boy whom he had recently visited in hospital. Two years later, after divorcing his first wife, Helen Woodford, Ruth starts to go into a slump. His teammate Lou Gehrig begins to steal his spotlight, becoming known as the "Iron Horse" and "The Pride of the Yankees". After getting pelted with lemons during a game, Ruth gets angry and storms onto the dugout, yelling at the crowd and further tarnishing his failing public image with the team.

However in 1927, Ruth returns to his old self and hits 60 home runs, breaking his old record of 59. During game three of the 1932 World Series against the Cubs, he "calls his shot" by pointing to center field, then hits a towering home run,

By 1934, Ruth's career is well on the decline. He wants to pursue his post-career ambition of managing a baseball team, but Yankees owner Colonel Jacob Ruppert decides to release him instead.  Under the promise of becoming a manager, Ruth signs with the Boston Braves, but his presence on the team is more comedic than anything else.  Before a game against the Pittsburgh Pirates, Ruth overhears the Boston owners saying he's only good for drawing a gate.  He responds by hitting three home runs in the game—then dramatically shuns the owner's proffered handshake of congratulations and drops his Braves cap on the ground, indicating that he is quitting the team.

The film ends with Ruth broken, trudging alone through the entrance tunnel. He is confronted by John, now a grown man, who tell Ruth that he is still his hero and returns the signed ball that Ruth gifted him during his hospital visit when Johnny was sick. Ruth remarks, "I'm gone, Johnny. I'm solid gone" and begins to leave, but Johnny calls after him "You're the best... you're the best there's ever been!"

Cast

 John Goodman – Babe Ruth
 Kelly McGillis – Claire Hodgson Ruth
 Trini Alvarado – Helen Woodford Ruth
 Bruce Boxleitner – Jumpin' Joe Dugan
 Peter Donat – Harry Frazee
 James Cromwell – Brother Mathias
 J. C. Quinn – Jack Dunn
 Joseph Ragno – Miller Huggins
 Richard Tyson – Guy Bush
 Ralph Marrero – Ping Bodie
 Bob Swan – George Herman Ruth Sr.
 Bernard Kates – Colonel Jacob Ruppert
 Michael McGrady – Lou Gehrig
 Danny Goldring – Bill Carrigan
 Guy Barile – Johnny Torrio
 Bernie Gigliotti – Al Capone
 Ian McCabe – Kid Who Fails Math Test
 W. Earl Brown – Herb Pennock
 Thom C. Simmons – Bill McKechnie
 Rick Reardon – Ernie Shore
 Randy Steinmeyer – Ty Cobb
 Wayne Messmer – Yankee Stadium Announcer
 Larry Cedar – Forbes Field Announcer
 Michael Kendall – Jack Warhop
 Harry Hutchinson – Tris Speaker
 Irma P. Hall – Fanny Baily
 Stephen Caffrey - Older Johnny
 Shannon Cochran – The Flopper

 Al Hoffman - Baseball player on Babe Ruths team

Production
The film took several liberties with Ruth's life and career, most notably in its portrayal of his "Called Shot" and his hitting of two home runs for a sick child. While the sick child story is a long-standing Ruth myth, the Called Shot's authenticity is still debated to this day. Nevertheless, the dramatic scene portrayed in the movie is mostly fabrication. The film also takes license with Ruth's first and final career homers. In the film, Ruth hits his first homer as a newcomer to the Red Sox in 1914. Ruth actually played sporadically for the Sox in 1914 and did not homer until 1915. His three final home runs did indeed come at Pittsburgh's Forbes Field in one afternoon; however, he did not retire following (or during) the game as seen in the film nor did he take a seat in the Pittsburgh Pirates dugout.  Furthermore, Ruth did not have a "courtesy runner" who would take over for Ruth upon reaching first base. Ruth appeared in five more games that year before injuring his knee and hanging it up.

Chicago's Wrigley Field stood in for Yankee Stadium during filming. Temporary walls were placed over the ivy-covered brick for the New York scenes. The ivy is depicted during the 1932 World Series scenes, where the action is taking place at Wrigley Field, although in 1932, the ivy had not yet been planted. Similarly, in a scene during Ruth's career with the Yankees, in a 1925 game vs. the Boston Red Sox at Fenway Park, he hits a home run and the Green Monster is depicted. The Green Monster at that time was actually covered with advertisements; it was not painted solid green until 1947.

Principal photography began on May 13, 1991, and wrapped on July 30, 1991.

Danville Stadium in Danville, Illinois, was where the scenes for Fenway Park and Forbes Field were filmed, as well as the black/white news footage.

Reception

Box office
The film was also not a financial success. It grossed over $19.9 million worldwide at the box-office and was pulled from theatres after five weeks.

Critical response
The film received mostly mixed reviews from critics. A frequent complaint was that Goodman did not remotely resemble Ruth. On Rotten Tomatoes it has an approval rating of 47% based on 38 reviews. Audiences surveyed by CinemaScore gave the film a grade A− on scale of A to F. Roger Ebert of the Chicago Times, gave the film a one out of four stars, averring that "Apart from being a bad film in the first place, aside from being superficially written, aside from being shot with little sense of time or place", it is also depressing and portrays Ruth as unlikable, unhappy, and possessing no admirable traits except hitting home runs.

In an interview on Inside the Actors Studio and The Howard Stern Show, John Goodman admitted that he was disappointed in his own performance.

See also
The Babe Ruth Story (1948) - cited as one of the worst movies of all time, starring William Bendix 
Babe Ruth - 1991 biopic starring Stephen Lang
The Natural (1984)
Everyone's Hero (2006)

References

External links 

 
 
 

1992 films
1990s biographical drama films
1990s sports films
Biographical films about sportspeople
Drama films based on actual events
Films set in 1902
Films set in 1914
Films set in the 1920s
Films set in the 1930s
Films set in 1932
Films set in Boston
Films set in Chicago
Films shot in Chicago
Sports films based on actual events
Cultural depictions of Babe Ruth
Ty Cobb
Cultural depictions of Al Capone
Cultural depictions of Johnny Torrio
American baseball films
Films directed by Arthur Hiller
Films with screenplays by John Fusco
Films scored by Elmer Bernstein
Universal Pictures films
1992 drama films
1990s English-language films
1990s American films
Films about Major League Baseball